Shamcey Gurrea Supsup-Lee (born May 16, 1986) is a Filipino architect, beauty pageant titleholder, and pageant organization director. She was crowned as Binibining Pilipinas Universe 2011. She represented the Philippines at the Miss Universe 2011 pageant in São Paulo, Brazil where she finished as 3rd Runner-Up.

In 2019, Supsup was appointed by Miss Universe Organization as national director for the Miss Universe Philippines Organization, succeeding former national director Stella Araneta of Binibining Pilipinas.

Early life and education 
Shamcey Gurrea Supsup was born on 16 May 1986 at Mercy Community Clinic in Iligan, Lanao del Norte, to Timoteo Ferolino Supsup and Marcelina Luega Gurrea. Supsup moved with her family to General Santos when she was three years old, where she was raised primarily by her father while her mother worked overseas. Before studying in Manila, she helped her father on a farm.

Supsup graduated valedictorian in grade school and salutatorian in high school. She graduated magna cum laude from the University of the Philippines Diliman with architecture as her field of discipline.

She topped the Philippines' licensure examination for architects in June 2010 with a board rating of 86.60%.

Pageantry

Binibining Pilipinas 2011

In 2011, Supsup joined the 48th edition of the Binibining Pilipinas pageant. During the question and answer portion, she was asked: "With what worthy cause do you identify yourself and why?" She responded:
"I think one worthy cause I can identify myself is valuing education because I believe that education is something that cannot be taken away from you. You can have money, you can have fame. But in the end, it can be taken from you. But education will always be there to help you in your life."

At the end of the event, Supsup won the title of Binibining Pilipinas Universe 2011 during the coronation night held at the Araneta Coliseum on April 10, 2011 alongside the Miss Philippine Airlines, Miss Talent and Miss Creamsilk awards.

On April 15, 2012, Supsup crowned Janine Tugonon as her successor at the Binibining Pilipinas 2012 pageant held at the Smart Araneta Coliseum in Quezon City, Philippines.

Miss Universe 2011

Supsup represented the Philippines at the Miss Universe 2011 pageant held in São Paulo, Brazil, on 12 September  2011. She became popular on the said competition because of her "Tsunami Walk". During the question and answer portion, she was asked: "Would you change your religious beliefs to marry the person you love? Why and why not?" She responded:
"If I had to change my religious beliefs, I will not marry the person that I love because the first person that I love is God, who created me. And I have my faith, my principles, and this is what makes me who I am. And if that person loves me, he should love my God too."

At the end of the event, she finished as 3rd Runner-Up to Leila Lopes of Angola. In 2019, she became the national director of the Miss Universe franchise in the Philippines, succeeding her former mentor and pageant director, Stella Araneta.

Television 
After participating in national pageants, Supsup became a judge in the talent show It's Showtime in 2011. After appearing on 18 episodes, Supsup left her seat to pursue preparations for her then-upcoming participation in Miss Universe 2011. She returned on TV It's Showtime as an occasional guest co-host, often filling in for Anne Curtis. She also returned to Binibining Pilipinas as a co-host and made appearance in the pre-pageant shows and finals events from 2012 to 2015. In November 2012, Supsup  hosted  the Miss Universe 2012 team as the host of the web coverage.

Supsup has also served as a host for the ANC lifestyle program CityScape. Supsup hosted the design digest program 'Interior Motives' on the cable channel Lifestyle Network. She replaced model and actress Angel Aquino. Since 2015, Supsup co-hosts the talk show Real Talk on CNN Philippines.

Personal life 
On December  29, 2013, Supsup married Lloyd Lee, a businessman. Former national director Stella Araneta was designated as one of the principal sponsors to their Christian wedding.
On 24 January 2016, Supsup gave birth to her first child named Nyla Kelcey. In September 2018, Supsup gave birth to her second child named Peter Nathan.

References

External links 

1986 births
Living people
Binibining Pilipinas winners
21st-century Filipino architects
Miss Universe 2011 contestants
Notre Dame Educational Association alumni
People from General Santos
Shamcey
University of the Philippines Diliman alumni